The Time Is Right is a live album led by trumpter Woody Shaw which was recorded in Italy in 1983 and released on the Red label.

Reception

Scott Yanow of Allmusic stated, "Although the quintet featured on this CD reissue from the Italian Red label was one of trumpeter Woody Shaw's finest, it failed to make much of an impact before breaking up... High-quality advanced hard bop".

Track listing 
 "(From) Moment to Moment" (Henry Mancini) - 12:16
 "Time Is Right" (Judi Singh) - 12:05
 "You and the Night and the Music" (Howard Dietz, Arthur Schwartz) - 12:17
 "We'll Be Together Again" (Carl T. Fischer, Frankie Laine) - 10:21

Personnel 
Woody Shaw - trumpet, flugelhorn
Steve Turre - trombone
Mulgrew Miller - piano 
Stafford James - bass
Tony Reedus - drums

References 

Woody Shaw live albums
1983 albums
Red Records live albums